The Cathedral School of Vilnius was a cathedral school attached to the Vilnius Cathedral. It is believed to be the earliest school in the Grand Duchy of Lithuania. For about a hundred years it was the only Catholic school in Vilnius (possibly due to a royal privilege prohibiting establishment of other schools). The cathedral school was merged with Vilnius Academy (now Vilnius University), established by the Jesuits in 1570.

The exact date of its establishment is unknown, but it must be sometime between the Christianization of Lithuania in 1386 and school's first mention in written sources on 9 May 1397. It was initially a primary school, evolving into a secondary school by the first half of the 15th century. Most likely the school taught trivium and quadrivium and catered to church needs educating lower clergy. Its first pupils were indigenous Christians that also knew the Lithuanian language. In 1522, Bishop John expanded the school to three classes and introduced courses in rhetoric, dialectics, classical literature, arithmetic, music. The students studied Distichs of Cato and Ars grammatica by Aelius Donatus. In 1539, the school had twelve boys who sang in a church choir and twenty boys who served as altar boys. During its existence, the school prepared over 100 students who later pursued academic careers at the Jagiellonian University in Kraków.

See also
 List of the oldest schools in the world

References

Educational institutions established in the 14th century
Defunct schools in Vilnius
Catholic schools in Lithuania
Defunct Jesuit schools